Faedo (Faé in local dialect) was a comune (municipality) in Trentino in the northern Italian region Trentino-Alto Adige/Südtirol, located about  north of Trento. Faedo was annexed to the municipality of San Michele all'Adige as of 1 January 2020.

Geography
Faedo borders the following municipalities: Mezzocorona, Giovo and Salorno.

Demographic evolution

References

External links

Cities and towns in Trentino-Alto Adige/Südtirol
Former municipalities of Trentino
San Michele all'Adige